William Turnbull may refer to:

William Turnbull (bishop) (died 1454), Scottish bishop
Bill Turnbull (1956–2022), British journalist and presenter
William Turnbull (artist) (1922–2012), Scottish artist
William Turnbull Jr. (1935–1997), American architect
William Turnbull (New Zealand architect) (1868–1941), architect based in Wellington, New Zealand
William Turnbull (sailor) (born 1933), Hong Kong sailor
William Barclay Turnbull (1811–1863), Scottish antiquary
William D. Turnbull (1922–2011), American paleontologist